Donald MacDonald (February 8, 1886 – August 6, 1972) was an American actor and director of the silent era. He appeared in more than 80 films between 1911 and 1934. He also directed 40 films between 1913 and 1917. He was born in California and died in Los Angeles, California.

Partial filmography

 Almost a Rescue (1913)
 The Abandonment (1916 - directed)
 The Smugglers of Santa Cruz (1916 - directed)
 A Desert Wooing (1918)
 Who Cares? (1919)
 The Law of Men (1919)
 Silk Hosiery (1920)
 The Yellow Typhoon (1920)
 45 Minutes from Broadway (1920)
 The White Dove (1920)
 The Woman in the Suitcase (1920)
 The Sky Pilot (1921)
 Greater Than Love (1921)
 A Midnight Bell (1921)
 Her Face Value (1921)
 The Woman He Married (1922)
 The Bootlegger's Daughter (1922)
 Lorna Doone (1922)
 Crashin' Thru (1923)
 Stepping Fast (1923)
 Another Man's Wife (1924)
 If Marriage Fails (1925)
 When Danger Calls (1927)

External links

1886 births
1972 deaths
American male film actors
American male silent film actors
Male actors from California
Film directors from California
20th-century American male actors